William Beeton may refer to:

William A. Beeton Jr. (1943–2002),  American attorney and politician
William Hugh Beeton (1903–1976), Ghana commissioner